State Council of Education may refer to:

 State Council of Higher Education for Virginia, the Commonwealth's coordinating body for higher education
 West Bengal State Council of Technical Education, is the statutory body and a state-level council for technical education in India